Ernest Hall (29 April 1851 – 3 March 1936) was an English first-class cricketer. He was a right-handed batsman who played primarily as a wicket-keeper and made his debut for Hampshire 1880 against the Marylebone Cricket Club. Hall represented Hampshire in eleven first-class matches between 1880 and 1885, with his final first-class match coming against Kent in the 1885 season, which was to be Hampshire's last season with first-class status until the 1895 County Championship. In Hall's eleven matches for Hampshire he scored 198 runs at an average of 10.42 and behind the stumps he took eleven catches and made two stumpings.

Hall played one further match for Hampshire, which came in 1886 against the Marylebone Cricket Club, with Hampshire being stripped of first-class status at the end of the previous year, it was a non first-class match.

Hall died in Botley, Hampshire on 3 March 1936.

Family
Hall's son Patrick Hall also represented Hampshire in first-class, as well as Oxford University.

External links
Ernest Hall at Cricinfo
Ernest Hall at CricketArchive
Matches and detailed statistics for Ernest Hall

1851 births
1936 deaths
People from Newmarket, Suffolk
English cricketers
Hampshire cricketers
People from Botley, Hampshire
Wicket-keepers